Abel F. Hayden, (September 12, 1835April 11, 1889) was a 19th-century American Maritime pilot. He was one of the oldest Boston pilots, serving for over thirty years. He helped bring in the USS San Jacinto, into the Boston Harbor in 1861. Hayden was owner of the pilot-boat D. J. Lawlor, that was struck by a fishing schooner Horace B. Parker, in 1895.

Early life

Hayden was born on September 12, 1835 in Boston, Massachusetts. His father was Abel T. Hayden, a pilot in the Boston Harbor and original owner of the Pet, No. 9. His mother was Caroline A. Beck, daughter of Captain Charles A. Beck keeper of the Long Island Head Light. He was married and had two sons.

Career

Hayden started in the pilot business in 1853, piloting packet boats to and from Cohasset, Massachusetts. He piloted the Neponset River from Milton Lower Falls down to the ship channel. He was boatkeeper for the Coynette.

In 1858, Hayden received his commission to pilot vessels in Boston Harbor and Massachusetts Bay. He joined the pilot-boat William Starkey, No. 2, and was in command of the pilot-boats  Phantom, Friend, Haze, Clarence Barclay, Edwin Forrest,  Pet, and Gracie.

In November 1861, during the American Civil War, Hayden was dispatched by the government to Newport, Rhode Island to bring the steamer  San Jacinto to Boston. On board were two Confederate diplomats James Murray Mason and John Slidell who were taken from a British mail packet RMS Trent. Captain Hayden anchored the San Jacinto in the channel, and the two men were moved to  Fort Warren. They were then released on New Year's Day, 1862, and taken to Provincetown, Massachusetts, to board HMS Rinaldo for passage to London. The incident strained United States relations with Britain and came to be known as the Trent Affair.

His last service was on the pilot-boat D. J. Lawlor, No. 3, in 1882, which he was the principal owner. Hayden was one-third owner of the Lawlor, along with James H. Reid and William V. Abbott. Hayden was the boat master. 

After the Lawlor was lost in the collision with the fishing schooner Horace B. Parker in 1895, he retired. On the advice of his doctor, he moved with his wife and two sons to the Pacific coast.

Death

Hayden died on April 11, 1899 in Port Townsend, Washington. He was one of the oldest Boston pilots, serving for over thirty years.

See also
 List of Northeastern U. S. Pilot Boats

References

People from Boston
Maritime pilotage
Sea captains
1919 deaths
1835 births